Atlee is an unincorporated community in Jefferson County, Oklahoma, United States.

References

Unincorporated communities in Jefferson County, Oklahoma
Unincorporated communities in Oklahoma